The 1963–64 season of the European Cup club football tournament saw Internazionale win the title with a 3–1 victory over Real Madrid. It was the second consecutive season that an Italian team had won the competition.

Milan, the defending champions, were eliminated by Real Madrid in the quarter-finals.

Cyprus entered its champion for the first time this season.

Preliminary round 

|}

Notes:
For the first time in tournament history, only the title holder, Milan, received a bye.

First leg

Second leg 

Internazionale won 1–0 on aggregate.

Monaco won 8–3 on aggregate.

Jeunesse Esch won 5–4 on aggregate.

Partizan won 6–1 on aggregate.

Górnik Zabrze 1–1 Austria Wien on aggregate.

Górnik Zabrze won 2–1 in play-off match.

Dukla Prague won 8–0 on aggregate.

Benfica won 8–3 on aggregate.

Borussia Dortmund won 7–3 on aggregate.

Zürich won 4–2 on aggregate.

Galatasaray won 4–2 on aggregate.

Spartak Plovdiv won 3–2 on aggregate.

PSV Eindoven won 11–4 on aggregate.

Norrköping won 2–1 on aggregate.

Dinamo București won 3–0 on aggregate.

Real Madrid won 7–0 on aggregate.

Bracket

First round 

|}

1 Zürich advanced to the second round over Galatasaray by winning a coin toss, after their play-off match ended 2–2.

First leg

Second leg 

Dukla Prague won 4–3 on aggregate.

Borussia Dortmund won 6–2 on aggregate.

Partizan won 7–4 on aggregate.

Internazionale won 4–1 on aggregate.

PSV Eindhoven won 1–0 on aggregate.

Zürich 2–2 Galatasaray on aggregate.

Zürich 2–2 Galatasaray in play-off match. Zürich qualified on a coin toss.

Real Madrid won 8–4 on aggregate.

Milan won 6–3 on aggregate.

Quarter-finals 

|}

First leg

Second leg 

Borussia Dortmund won 5–3 on aggregate.

Internazionale won 4–1 on aggregate.

Zürich won 3–2 on aggregate.

Real Madrid won 4–3 on aggregate.

Semi-finals 

|}

First leg

Second leg 

Internazionale won 4–2 on aggregate.

Real Madrid won 8–1 on aggregate.

Final

Top scorers 
7 goals
  Vladica Kovačević ( Partizan)
  Sandro Mazzola ( Internazionale)
  Ferenc Puskás ( Real Madrid)

External links 
1963–64 All matches – season at UEFA website
European Cup 1963–64 results at Rec.Sport.Soccer Statistics Foundation
All scorers 1963-63 European Cup (excluding preliminary round) according to protocols UEFA 
1963-64 European Cup - results and line-ups (archive)

Europa
European Champion Clubs' Cup seasons